Tegtmeiers Reisen (“Tegtmeier's Travels”) is a 20 episode German television series (from 1972 until 1980 in ZDF) that featured two travelers, Adolf Tegtmeier and Dr. Tegtmeier, that would explore various countries. The first episode („Die Gelsenkirchener Odyssee“) was about Greece, the last one („Olala“) was about Paris.

See also
List of German television series

External links
 

German comedy television series
1972 German television series debuts
1980 German television series endings
German-language television shows
ZDF original programming